Wouter Hamel (born 1977) is a Dutch Pop singer. He released his debut album Hamel in March 2007. Hamel's style has been compared to Jamie Cullum's.

Biography
After winning the Dutch Jazz Vocal Competition in 2005, Hamel received significant attention from the Dutch media. He has since performed on several television shows and on the internationally-known North Sea Jazz Festival. His debut album, for which he wrote all of the twelve songs, was released to critical acclaim. It peaked at #40 on the Dutch Albums Top 100. Hamel also released the song "Breezy" as a single in Japan, where it reached #36 on the Tokio Hot 100 chart.

In 2011, Hamel released his third album Lohengrin and also supported Caro Emerald on her tour in Germany.

Discography

Studio albums

References

External links

Official website
Official Facebook Page

Dutch jazz singers
1977 births
Living people
Musicians from The Hague
21st-century Dutch male singers
21st-century Dutch singers
Male jazz musicians